Turtur is a small genus of doves native to Sub-Saharan Africa. Species in this genus are known as wood doves.

The genus Turtur was introduced in 1783 by the Dutch naturalist Pieter Boddaert to accommodate the blue-spotted wood dove (Turtur afer). The word Turtur is Latin for "turtle dove".

Species
The genus contains five species:

References

 
Bird genera